Christopher Allen Codiroli (born March 26, 1958) is a former professional baseball player who pitched in the Major Leagues in 1982–1988 and 1990. In 144 career games, he had 38 wins, 47 losses, 312 strikeouts, and a 4.87 earned run average.

Codiroli was drafted on January 10, 1978, by the Detroit Tigers in the 1st round (11th overall) of the 1978 amateur draft. Codiroli won a career high 14 games in 1985. He also led the A's in wins that year.

External links
 Baseball Reference

1958 births
Living people
Major League Baseball pitchers
Oakland Athletics players
Cleveland Indians players
Kansas City Royals players
Baseball players from Oakland, California
San Jose City Jaguars baseball players
San Jose State Spartans baseball players
Hagerstown Suns players
Montgomery Rebels players
Lakeland Tigers players
West Haven A's players
Colorado Springs Sky Sox players
San Jose Missions players
Tacoma Tigers players
Omaha Royals players
Rochester Red Wings players
Memphis Chicks players
Alaska Goldpanners of Fairbanks players